John Sterrett may refer to:
 John H. Sterrett, American ship captain and investor
 John Robert Sitlington Sterrett, American classical scholar and archeologist